Audrey J. S. Carrion (born July 16, 1958) is an American judge who has served as an associate judge on the Eighth Judicial Circuit in Baltimore, Maryland since 1999.

Early life 
Carrion was born on July 16, 1958, in New York City, New York. She graduated with a Bachelor's degree from the Notre Dame of Maryland University in 1981 then with a Juris Doctor from the University of Baltimore School of Law in 1984.

Personal life 
Carrion is an outspoken lesbian and has supported LGBT rights throughout her career.

See also 
 List of LGBT jurists in the United States

References 

1958 births
Living people
21st-century American women
21st-century American LGBT people
American women judges
Hispanic and Latino American judges
American lesbians
LGBT judges
Notre Dame of Maryland University alumni
People from New York City
University of Baltimore School of Law alumni